The Señoret Channel is a navigable surface water body in the Patagonian region of Chile. One of the major towns along the channel is Puerto Natales.  Hermann Eberhard, the first European to explore the interior of northern Patagonia, used the Señoret Channel to navigate northward in order to access the remote portions of this region. One of his findings was the Milodon Cave at the base of the Cerro Benitez, where he recovered remains of the extinct Giant sloth and evidence of habitation of early man from 10,000 BC.

See also
Fjords and channels of Chile
Eberhard Fjord
Lago Porteño 
Turbio River

References
 Embassy of Chile, Washington DC (2008) Patagonia, Austral Road, Fjords and Glaciers Torres del Paine and Tierra del Fuego 
 C. Michael Hogan (2008) Cueva del Milodon, Megalithic Portal, ed. A. Burnham

Line notes

Straits of Chile
Bodies of water of Magallanes Region
Última Esperanza Province